"Someday, Someday" is the third single released from Australian pop rock band Thirsty Merc's debut album, Thirsty Merc (2004). The song was released on 22 November 2004 and reached number 19 on the Australian Singles Chart in January 2005.

Music video
The music video features Thirsty Merc frontman Rai Thistlethwayte walking into a hotel and in the hotel lift singing the song, crossing the shot to his girlfriend, the two appear to be separated, as the song's chorus suggests "Someday, someday I will be there, babe. Someday, someday I will be the one, babe". It was used for the Channel Ten series première of American show House.

Track listing
Australian CD single
 "Someday, Someday" – 3:42
 "Stick to Your Guns" – 4:06
 "Emancipate Myself" (live) – 5:08
 "Get Over Myself" (live) – 3:31
 "My Completeness" (video)

Charts

References

Thirsty Merc songs
2004 singles
2004 songs
Songs written by Rai Thistlethwayte
Warner Music Australasia singles